Takatoshi (written: 高資, 高俊, 高利, 高松, 孝駿, 隆敏, 貴俊, 昂聡 or 宝寿) is a masculine Japanese given name. Notable people with the name include:

, Japanese hurdler
, Japanese daimyō
, Japanese economist and academic
, Japanese actor
, Japanese footballer
, Japanese businessman
, Japanese footballer
, Japanese samurai

Japanese masculine given names